Longwell is a surname. Notable people with the surname include:

Gary Longwell (born 1971), Irish international rugby player
Jeff Longwell (born 1960), American politician and businessman
John Longwell (1883 – ?), American football player, football and basketball coach, and dentist
Mark Longwell (born 1960), American soccer player
Ryan Longwell (born 1974), American football player 
Sarah Longwell, American political strategist and publisher